Bartley Stone Dinsmore (17 November 1879 – 27 January 1970) was an Australian rules footballer who played for the St Kilda Football Club in the Victorian Football League (VFL).

References

External links 

1879 births
1970 deaths
VFL/AFL players born outside Australia
Australian rules footballers from Victoria (Australia)
St Kilda Football Club players
People educated at Wesley College (Victoria)
Collegians Football Club players
Sportspeople from Glasgow
Scottish emigrants to colonial Australia
Scottish players of Australian rules football